Sandoricum koetjape, the santol, sentul or cotton fruit, is a tropical fruit native to maritime Southeast Asia (Malesia).

Origin and distribution
The santol is native to the Malesian floristic region, but have been introduced to Indochina, Sri Lanka, India, northern Australia, Mauritius, and Seychelles. It is commonly cultivated throughout these regions and the fruits are seasonally abundant in the local  and international markets.

Botanical description

There are two varieties of santol fruit, previously considered two different species, the yellow variety and the red. The difference is in the color that the older leaves turn before falling.  The red appears to be more common and the reddish leaves mixed with the green ones add to the distinction and attractiveness of the tree.  The fruits are often the size, shape and slightly fuzzy texture of peaches, with a reddish tinge.  Both types have a skin that may be a thin peel to a thicker rind, according to the variety. It is often edible and in some cultivars may contain a milky juice. The central pulp near the seeds may be sweet or sour and contains inedible brown seeds.  In some varieties the outer rind is thicker and is the main edible portion, with a mild peachy taste combined with some taste and the pulpy texture of apples. In others the outer rind is thinner and harder and the inner whitish pulp around the seeds is eaten.  This may be rather sour in many cultivars, which has reduced the general acceptance of the tree.  Most improved varieties have increased thickness of the edible outer rind, which can be eaten with a spoon leaving just the outer skin, and should increase the acceptance of the santol worldwide.

The fruit grows on a fast-growing tree that may reach 150 feet in height. It bears ribbed leaves and pink or yellow-green flowers about 1 centimeter long.

Uses
The ripe fruits are harvested by climbing the tree and plucking by hand, alternatively a long stick with a forked end may be used to twist the fruits off. The pulp is eaten raw and plain or with spices added. It is also cooked and candied or made into marmalade. 

In Filipino cuisine, grated rind is cooked in coconut milk (with bits of pork and hot pepper) and served as sinantolan in Southern Luzon. The partly ripe sour fruits are also used as a souring agent in sour broth dishes like sinigang.

In Thai cuisine this fruit is used to make som tam when still not fully ripe. It is also one of the main ingredients in the santol and pork (แกงหมูกระท้อน) and santol and prawn Thai curries (แกงคั่วกระท้อนกุ้ง). 

The wood of the tree is useful for construction, being plentiful and usually easy to work and polish. It makes a good shade tree. The leaves and bark have been used medicinally as a poultice. Several parts of the plant may have anti-inflammatory effects, and some chemical extracts from santol stems have shown anti-cancer properties in vitro. Extracts from santol seeds have insecticidal properties.

Intestinal obstruction and perforation
Doctors in Thailand and the Philippines have warned about the risk of intestinal obstruction and perforation from swallowing the whole seeds of Sandoricum koetjape. One source claims there are about 200 cases annually in the Philippines. The "bangkok santol", a larger variety, may be responsible for more severe cases of abdominal surgery. Common symptoms are abdominal pain with peritonitis that requires surgery to remove the seeds. In one retrospective review, 6 of 30 patients with Sandorica seed-induced colon perforation died within 28 days following the development of septic shock.

Cultivation
It grows better in deep and organic grounds, and with rainfall distributed throughout the year, although it also tolerates long, dry periods.
It requires fertilization two times a year so it can grow better. Normally, seed trees produce fruit after 5 or 7 years of age, though some cultivars need only 3 or 4.
The santol is a very productive tree. A mature tree can produce between 18,000 and 24,000 fruits per year. In Puerto Rico it produces in the months of August and September.

References

External links

Horticultural Info

koetjape
Edible fruits
Trees of Malesia
Fruit trees
Taxa named by Nicolaas Laurens Burman